Lawrence Township is the name of two places in the U.S. state of New Jersey:
Lawrence Township, Cumberland County, New Jersey
Lawrence Township, Mercer County, New Jersey

See also
Lawrence Township (disambiguation)

New Jersey township disambiguation pages